The 2021 Pacific hurricane season is an event in the annual tropical cyclone season in the North Pacific Ocean. It officially began on May 15 for the Eastern Pacific and on June 1 for the Central Pacific. Both seasons ended on November 30, though storms often develop outside the season boundaries. These dates, adopted by convention, historically describe the period in each year when most Eastern Pacific tropical systems form. However, storm formation is possible at any time of the year, as illustrated in 2021 by the formation of the season's first named storm, Tropical Storm Andres, on May 9. This was the earliest formation of a tropical storm on record in the basin, with all earlier tropical cyclones being found in the Central Pacific.

This timeline documents tropical cyclone formations, strengthening, weakening, landfalls, extratropical transitions, and dissipations during the season. It includes information that was not released throughout the season, meaning that data from post-storm reviews by the National Hurricane Center, such as a storm that was not initially warned upon, has been included.

By convention, meteorologists use one time zone when issuing forecasts and making observations: Coordinated Universal Time (UTC), and also use the 24-hour clock (where 00:00 = midnight UTC). Tropical cyclone advisories in the Eastern North Pacific basin use both UTC and the nautical time zone where the center of the tropical cyclone is currently located. Time zones utilized (east to west) are: Central, Mountain, Pacific and Hawaii. In this timeline, all information is listed by UTC first, with the respective regional time zone included in parentheses. Additionally, figures for maximum sustained winds and position estimates are rounded to the nearest 5 units (knots, miles, or kilometers), following National Hurricane Center practice. Direct wind observations are rounded to the nearest whole number. Atmospheric pressures are listed to the nearest millibar and nearest hundredth of an inch of mercury.

Timeline

May

May 9
 06:00 UTC (12:00 a.m.
 12:00 UTC (6:00 a.m.

May 10
 18:00 UTC (6:00 p.m.

May 11
 06:00 UTC (12:00 a.m.

May 15
 The Eastern Pacific hurricane season officially begins.

May 30

 18:00 UTC (12:00 p.m.

May 31
 12:00 UTC (6:00 a.m.

June 

June 1
 The Central Pacific hurricane season officially begins.
 06:00 UTC (12:00 a.m.

June 2
 18:00 UTC (12:00 p.m.

June 4
 00:00 UTC (5:00 p.m.

June 12
 12:00 UTC (5:00 a.m.
 18:00 UTC (11:00 a.m. PDT) at   Tropical Depression Three-E strengthens into Tropical Storm Carlos a mere 6 hours after becoming a tropical depression.

June 13
 06:00 UTC (11:00 p.m.

June 14
 18:00 UTC (11:00 a.m.

June 16
 12:00 UTC (5:00 a.m.

June 18

 06:00 UTC (1:00 a.m.
12:00 UTC (7:00 a.m. CDT) at  – Tropical Depression Four-E strengthens into Tropical Storm Dolores promptly after forming.
June 19
12:00 UTC (7:00 a.m.
 15:00 UTC (10:00 a.m.

June 20
00:00 UTC (7:00 p.m. CDT June 19) at   Tropical Storm Dolores weakens into a Tropical Depression soon after making landfall. 
06:00 UTC (1:00 a.m. CDT)  Tropical Depression Dolores dissipates soon after weakening into a tropical depression over central Mexico. 
June 25

June 26

June 27
 18:00 UTC (12:00 p.m.

June 28
 18:00 UTC (12:00 p.m.

June 30
 12:00 UTC (6:00 a.m.
 18:00 UTC (12:00 p.m.

July 

July 14

 00:00 UTC (6:00 p.m.
 06:00 UTC (12:00 a.m. MDT) at   Tropical Depression Six-E strengthens into Tropical Storm Felicia and undergoes rapid intensification.

July 15
06:00 UTC (11:00 p.m.
18:00 UTC (11:00 a.m.

July 16
09:00 UTC (2:00 a.m.
21:00 UTC (11:00 a.m.

July 17
15:00 UTC (5:00 a.m.
15:00 UTC (9:00 a.m.
21:00 UTC (3:00 p.m.

July 18
21:00 UTC (11:00 a.m.
21:00 UTC (3:00 p.m.

July 19
03:00 UTC (5:00 p.m.
15:00 UTC (5:00 a.m.
21:00 UTC (11:00 a.m.
21:00 UTC (11:00 a.m.

July 20
21:00 UTC (11:00 a.m.
21:00 UTC (2:00 p.m.

July 21
03:00 UTC (5:00 p.m.

July 30
21:00 UTC (3:00 p.m.
21:00 UTC (2:00 p.m.

August 

August 1
03:00 UTC (8:00 p.m.
09:00 UTC (2:00 a.m.
09:00 UTC (11:00 p.m.
21:00 UTC (3:00 p.m.

August 2
15:00 UTC (9:00 a.m.
21:00 UTC (3:00 p.m.

August 3
09:00 UTC (2:00 a.m.
09:00 UTC (2:00 a.m.

August 4
03:00 UTC (8:00 p.m.
21:00 UTC (11:00 a.m.

August 5
09:00 UTC (11:00 p.m.
15:00 UTC (5:00 a.m.
15:00 UTC (8:00 a.m.

August 6
15:00 UTC (8:00 a.m.
21:00 UTC (11:00 a.m.

August 7
03:00 UTC (5:00 p.m.
15:00 UTC (10:00 a.m.
21:00 UTC (3:00 p.m.

August 8
21:00 UTC (3:00 p.m.

August 10
09:00 UTC (4:00 a.m.
21:00 UTC (4:00 p.m.

August 12
09:00 UTC (2:00 a.m.
15:00 UTC (8:00 a.m.
15:00 UTC (9:00 a.m.

August 13
15:00 UTC (9:00 a.m.
21:00 UTC (3:00 p.m.

August 14
15:00 UTC (8:00 a.m.

August 15
03:00 UTC (8:00 p.m.
21:00 UTC (11:00 a.m.

August 17
09:00 UTC (11:00 p.m.

August 18
03:00 UTC (5:00 p.m.

August 19
03:00 UTC (5:00 p.m.
15:00 UTC (5:00 a.m.

August 20
15:00 UTC (5:00 a.m.

August 23
09:00 UTC (4:00 p.m.

August 24
03:00 UTC (8:00 p.m.
15:00 UTC (8:00 a.m.
21:00 UTC (2:00 p.m.

August 25
21:00 UTC (4:00 p.m.

August 26
15:00 UTC (10:00 a.m.

August 28
09:00 UTC (4:00 a.m.

August 29
18:00 UTC (12:00 p.m.

August 30
06:00 UTC (12:00 a.m.
09:00 UTC (3:00 a.m.

September 

September 7
21:00 UTC (3:00 p.m.

September 8
15:00 UTC (9:00 a.m.

September 9
15:00 UTC (9:00 a.m.

September 10
03:00 UTC (9:00 p.m.
03:00 UTC (9:00 p.m.
06:00 UTC (12:00 a.m.
15:00 UTC (9:00 a.m.

September 11
03:00 UTC (9:00 p.m.
15:00 UTC (9:00 a.m.

October 

October 10
09:00 UTC (4:00 a.m.
21:00 UTC (4:00 p.m.

October 12
09:00 UTC (3:00 a.m.
21:00 UTC (3:00 p.m.

October 13
09:00 UTC (3:00 a.m.
12:00 UTC (6:00 a.m.
15:00 UTC (9:00 a.m.
21:00 UTC (4:00 p.m.

October 14
03:00 UTC (10:00 p.m.

October 22
15:00 UTC (10:00 a.m.
21:00 UTC (4:00 p.m.

October 23
12:00 UTC (7:00 a.m.

October 25
06:00 UTC (1:00 a.m.
10:00 UTC (5:00 a.m.
15:00 UTC (10:00 a.m.
18:00 UTC (1:00 p.m.
21:00 UTC (4:00 p.m.

October 26
03:00 UTC (10:00 p.m.

November

November 4
15:00 UTC (10:00 a.m.

November 7
15:00 UTC (8:00 a.m.
21:00 UTC (3:00 p.m.
21:00 UTC (1:00 p.m.

November 8
15:00 UTC (8:00 a.m.
21:00 UTC (1:00 p.m.

November 9
21:00 UTC (1:00 p.m.

November 10
21:00 UTC (1:00 p.m.

November 30
 The Eastern and Central Pacific hurricane seasons officially end.

See also

 Timeline of the 2021 Atlantic hurricane season
 Tropical cyclones in 2021

References

External links

 2021 Tropical Cyclone Advisory Archive, National Hurricane Center and Central Pacific Hurricane Center, noaa.gov

2021 Pacific hurricane season
Pacific hurricane meteorological timelines
Articles which contain graphical timelines